USS Stars and Stripes was a 407-ton  steamer acquired  by the U.S. Navy and put to use by the Union during the American Civil War.

Stars and Stripes  served the Union Navy primarily as a screw gunboat, and as a tugboat when necessary, in the blockade of the rivers and ports of the Confederate States of America.

Service history

Civil War operations 

Stars and Stripes—a screw steamer built at Mystic, Connecticut, by Charles Mallory as a speculation for C. S. Bushnell—was purchased by the Navy at New York City from C. S. Bushnell on 27 July 1861; was fitted out for naval service at the New York Navy Yard and was commissioned there on 19 September 1861, Lt. Reed Werden in command.

Assigned to the Atlantic Blockading Squadron, Stars and Stripes reached Hampton Roads, Virginia, on 26 September. Two days later, she was ordered to tow schooners of the Stone Fleet to Hatteras Inlet, North Carolina. She arrived off Hatteras Inlet on 1 October and operated in that vicinity for the next few months. Because of the draft of the Stars and Stripes and the Underwriter, Lt. Werden was unwilling to have them enter Pamlico Sound due to shallowness of Hatteras Inlet. On 2 November, a Confederate vessel engaged the Stars and Stripes at long range briefly before retiring. The exchange was ineffectual since neither ship came within range of the other's guns. On 5 and 6 November, the ships under Lt. Werden's command attempted to provide assistance to the French corvette Prony which had run aground, but between concern for the weather and Rebel activity, proved unable to do so. On 15 December, she captured schooner Charity and sent her to New York City for adjudication.
 
On 7 February 1862, the screw gunboat was in the squadron which attacked Roanoke Island and the next day captured that base which controlled communication between Pamlico Sound and Albemarle Sound. She operated in the inland waters of North Carolina and helped capture New Bern, North Carolina, in mid-March. Stars and Stripes returned to Norfolk, Virginia, on 4 June for repairs and sailed on the evening of the 10th for blockading duty off Wilmington, North Carolina. Shortly before dawn on the 27th, she helped  destroy blockade-running steamer Modem Greece which that Union blockader had run aground. On 24 August, Stars and Stripes captured British ship Mary Elizabeth attempting to slip into Wilmington with a cargo of salt and fruit.

The wear and tear of hard duty forced Stars and Stripes to sail, via Norfolk, Virginia, to Philadelphia, Pennsylvania, for repairs. She was decommissioned at the Norfolk Navy Yard on 14 September. Quickly restored to a serviceable condition, the ship was recommissioned on 29 September and was assigned to the East Gulf Blockading Squadron. The steamer reached Key West, Florida, and spent the remainder of the Civil War operating off the gulf coast of Florida. In 1864, she captured blockade-running steamer Laura off the Ochlockonee on 18 January; she destroyed an extensive Confederate fishery at Marsh Island on 19 and 20 October and captured the troops stationed there as guards; and she joined three other gunboats in an expedition on 3 December which destroyed extensive salt works at Rocky Point in Tampa Bay. After the end of the Civil War, Stars and Stripes sailed north and was decommissioned at Philadelphia on 30 June 1865. She was sold at public auction there on 10 August 1865 to Thomas Watson and Sons of New York City.

Later career 

Stars and Stripes was redocumented on 18 September 1865 as Metropolis. The ship operated in merchant service until, while steaming from Philadelphia to Pará, Brazil, she was wrecked on the outer bar of Currituck Beach, North Carolina, on the evening of 31 January 1878. Both the ship and her cargo were a total loss. 85 persons lost their lives.

References  

Ships of the Union Navy
Ships built in Mystic, Connecticut
Steamships of the United States Navy
Gunboats of the United States Navy
American Civil War patrol vessels of the United States
Shipwrecks of the Carolina coast
Maritime incidents in January 1878